Nikola Mijailović may refer to:

 Nikola Mijailović (footballer) (born 1982), Serbian footballer
 Nikola Mijailović (singer) (born 1973), Serbian baritone
 Nikola Mijailović (volleyball) (born 1989), Serbian volleyball player